Ukpong Esther Sunday (born 13 March 1992) is a Nigerian footballer, who plays for OKS Stomil Olsztyn. Sunday has previously played at a club level for Sunshine Queens and Pelican Stars in the Nigerian Women's Championship, as well as FC Minsk in the Belarusian Premier League. She has also played at an international level for the Nigeria women's national football team in several tournaments.

Playing career

Club

Esther Sunday previously played for the Sunshine Queens and Pelican Stars, both in the Nigerian Women's Championship, before going on to join FC Minsk of the Belarusian Premier League. While there, she was among three Nigerian internationals in the team when the club won the Premier League, the Belarusian Women's Cup and the Belarusian Women's Super Cup.

In January 2016, she moved to Turkey joining Trabzon İdmanocağı. She appeared in the Turkish Cosmetics 2016 Tournament of the top four teams in the league, where she scored a goal en route to a victory with her new team.

In the beginning of the 2016–17 Women's First League's second half, she transferred to the Izmir-based club Konak Belediyespor. She debuted at the UEFA Women's Champions League, and took part in the three matches of the 2017–18 qualifying round.

In July 2018, Sunday signed a one-year contract with the Istanbul-based club Ataşehir Belediyespor before the 2017–18 league champion's participation at the 2018–19 UEFA Women's Champions League qualifying round. She played in all three matches of the qualification round, and scored one goal. In the 2019–20 First League season, she returned to her former club Konak Belediyespor. By October 2020, she transferred to the Gazianyep-based club ALG Spor.

International
Sunday has represented the Nigeria women's national football team at junior levels, being in the squads of the 2010 FIFA U-20 Women's World Cup (competition Runners-Up) and 2012 FIFA U-20 Women's World Cup. At senior level she was part of the squads for the African Women's Championship tournaments in 2010, 2012 and 2014, winning it twice in 2010 and 2014. She was also a member of the team which took part in the 2015 FIFA Women's World Cup, but did not progress past the group stage.

Career statistics
.

Honours

Club
 Belarusian Premier League
 FC Minsk
 Winners (1): 2014

 Belarusian Women's Cup
 FC Minsk
 Winners (1): 2014

 Belarusian Women's Super Cup
 FC Minsk
 Winners (1): 2015

 Turkish Women's First League
 Konak Belediyespor
 Winners (1): 2016–17

International
 African Women's Championship
 Nigeria women's national football team
 Winners (3): 2010, 2014, 2016

References

External links
 
 
 

1992 births
Living people
Sportspeople from Lagos
Nigerian women's footballers
Women's association football wingers
Nigeria women's international footballers
2015 FIFA Women's World Cup players
Nigerian expatriate sportspeople in Belarus
Expatriate women's footballers in Belarus
Nigerian expatriate sportspeople in Turkey
Expatriate women's footballers in Turkey
FC Minsk (women) players
Trabzon İdmanocağı women's players
Konak Belediyespor players
Ataşehir Belediyespor players
Pelican Stars F.C. players
Sunshine Queens F.C. players
ALG Spor players